Driss Maazouzi (born 15 October 1969 in Meknès) is a French 1500 metres runner who won a bronze medal at the 2001 World Championships in Edmonton. He won the 2003 IAAF World Indoor Championships.

Maazouzi represented Morocco up to and during the 1996 Summer Olympics, but as a naturalised citizen of France he switched nationality shortly afterwards.

References

1969 births
Living people
People from Meknes
Moroccan male middle-distance runners
French male middle-distance runners
Olympic athletes of France
Athletes (track and field) at the 1996 Summer Olympics
Athletes (track and field) at the 2000 Summer Olympics
World Athletics Championships athletes for France
World Athletics Championships athletes for Morocco
World Athletics Championships medalists
French sportspeople of Moroccan descent
Mediterranean Games gold medalists for Morocco
Athletes (track and field) at the 1997 Mediterranean Games
Mediterranean Games medalists in athletics
World Athletics Indoor Championships winners
20th-century Moroccan people
21st-century French people